John Dubienny (May 28, 1908 – December 1967) was an American soccer wing half.  In 1937, he earned three caps with the U.S. national team.  All three games came in losses to Mexico in September 1937.  He spent one season in the American Soccer League, beginning the 1928-1929 season with the Fall River Marksmen and ending it with the Boston Wonder Workers.

References

External links

1908 births
1967 deaths
Sportspeople from Fall River, Massachusetts
Soccer players from Massachusetts
American soccer players
United States men's international soccer players
American Soccer League (1921–1933) players
Fall River Marksmen players
Boston Soccer Club players
Association football midfielders